Senator Tweed may refer to:

Charles Austin Tweed (1842–1918), Florida State Senate and California State Senate
William M. Tweed (1823–1878), New York State Senate

See also
Senator Tweedy (disambiguation)